These are the Billboard magazine number-one albums from 1949.

Chart history

See also
1949 in music

References

1949
United States Albums
Number-one albums